Virius Gallus was a senator of the Roman Empire who was appointed consul in AD 298.

Biography
A member of the aristocratic gens Viria, Gallus’ early senatorial career is unknown. He was appointed consul posterior alongside Anicius Faustus Paulinus in 298. After his term as consul, Gallus was appointed the Corrector of the region of Campania.

He had not converted to Christianity, and reportedly had a statue of Dionysus to which he made sacrifices.

Sources
 Martindale, J. R.; Jones, A. H. M, The Prosopography of the Later Roman Empire, Vol. I AD 260–395, Cambridge University Press (1971)

References

3rd-century Romans
4th-century Romans
Imperial Roman consuls
Late Roman Empire political office-holders
Year of birth unknown
Year of death unknown